Realtogue Fort  is a ringfort (rath) and National Monument located in County Meath, Ireland.

Location
Realtogue ringfort is located about 3.5 km (2 miles) northwest of Kentstown and 1.6 km (1 mile) north of the River Nanny, a Boyne tributary. A holy well (Tobermurry) lies

Description

The ringfort is an oval, measuring  NW-SE and  NE-SW, with an external fosse. There is a house site (9 x 5 m) against the inner bank at the east. There is an entrance gap, but no causeway at the southeast.

References

Archaeological sites in County Meath
National Monuments in County Meath